Roxboro Steam Plant is a coal-fired electrical generation facility in Semora, North Carolina.

The plant has four units, the first opened in 1966.

See also

List of largest power stations in the United States

References 

Coal-fired power stations in North Carolina
Duke Energy